Codie Briggs (born 7 October 1990) is an Australian rules footballer who played for the Greater Western Sydney Giants in the AFL Women's competition. Briggs was recruited by Greater Western Sydney as a free agent in October 2016. She played three matches in her debut season. She was delisted at the end of the 2017 season and choose to pursue her career as a Pastry Chef

References

External links 

1990 births
Living people
Greater Western Sydney Giants (AFLW) players
Australian rules footballers from New South Wales